The Old U.S. Forest Products Laboratory is located in Madison, Wisconsin.

History
The building was the original headquarters of the Forest Products Laboratory, a research wing of the United States Forest Service. It housed the laboratory until 1932, at which time operations were moved to a building elsewhere in Madison on Gifford Pinchot Drive. Currently, it serves as the Materials Science & Engineering Building of the University of Wisconsin–Madison. It was listed on the National Register of Historic Places in 1985 and on the State Register of Historic Places in 1989.

References

Further reading
 

Government buildings on the National Register of Historic Places in Wisconsin
University and college buildings on the National Register of Historic Places in Wisconsin
National Register of Historic Places in Madison, Wisconsin
United States Forest Service architecture
Laboratories in the United States
University of Wisconsin–Madison
Buildings and structures in Madison, Wisconsin
Colonial Revival architecture in Wisconsin